Wanda Maria Ferreira de Sá (born July 1, 1944) (also Wanda de Sah) is a Brazilian bossa nova singer and guitarist, active from 1964 to the present day.

Her first guitar teacher, when she was 13, was Roberto Menescal. Later, she worked with Sérgio Mendes in his group Brasil '65' and also with Marcos Valle and Kátya Chamma. Francisco Tenório Júnior and Ugo Marotta played on her debut album Vagamente in 1965.

She was married to songwriter Edu Lobo from 1969 until 1982.

In 2011, she made her first appearance in the United States since 1999, playing with Marcos Valle at Birdland in New York City. The Wall Street Journal described her as "legendary". National Public Radio called her "one of Brazil's best-kept musical secrets".

Selected discography 

 Vagamente (1964)
 Softly! (1965)
 Amazon River (2000)
 Wanda Sá com João Donato (2004)
 Domingo Azul Do Mar (2005)

References

External links

Brazilian women guitarists
1944 births
Living people
Bossa nova singers
20th-century guitarists
21st-century guitarists
20th-century Brazilian women singers
20th-century Brazilian singers
21st-century Brazilian women singers
21st-century Brazilian singers
20th-century women guitarists
21st-century women guitarists